{{DISPLAYTITLE:C6H8}}
The molecular formula C6H8 may refer to:

 Cyclohexadiene (disambiguation)
 1,3-Cyclohexadiene
 1,4-Cyclohexadiene
 Methylcyclopentadiene
 Propellane
 The standard composition of gasoline (a mixture of different hydrocarbons) is approximately equivalent to C6H8